SK Sigma Olomouc is a Czech football club from the city of Olomouc. The club currently plays in the Czech First League, the first tier of Czech football. The club played in the first tier league for 30 years between 1984 and 2014, winning the Czech Cup and Czech Supercup in 2012. Being relegated to Czech National Football League in 2014, the club won the league the subsequent season and got a promotion back to First League in 2015, but failed to stay in the top division and were relegated after only one season.

History
The club was founded as FK Hejčín Olomouc in 1919, playing in the national top league for the first time in the 1982–83 season as Sigma ZTS Olomouc. The club next played in the Czechoslovak First League in the 1984–85 season, remaining in the top level of football for the rest of the Czechoslovak era. Olomouc reached the quarterfinals of the 1991–92 UEFA Cup, their best result in the competition. In the following season's competition, the club beat Turkish side Fenerbahçe 7–1 in the second leg of their second round tie and 7–2 on aggregate, before going out of the competition at the hands of Italian team Juventus.

The club qualified to play European football in 1996 after finishing as runners-up in the 1995–96 Czech First League.

Olomouc finished fourth in the 1998–99 Czech First League, again qualifying for European competition. The club was fined 5,000 Swiss francs in October 1999 for racist chanting in a UEFA Cup match against Real Mallorca's black players.

In August 2011, the club was fined 4 million Czech koruna and deducted nine points as a result of a corruption enquiry by the Football Association of the Czech Republic. Olomouc won the Czech Cup that season, but were banned by UEFA from competing in the subsequent UEFA Europa League due to the corruption sanctions. In 2014 the club finished 15th in the league, resulting in their relegation after 30 years in the top level of competition.

Historical names
 1919 – FK Hejčín Olomouc (Fotbalový klub Hejčín Olomouc)
 1949 – Sokol MŽ Olomouc (Sokol Moravské železárny Olomouc)
 1953 – DSO Baník MŹ Olomouc (Dobrovolná sportovní organizace Baník Moravské železárny Olomouc)
 1960 – TJ MŽ Olomouc (Tělovýchovná jednota Moravské železárny Olomouc)
 1966 – TJ Sigma MŽ Olomouc (Tělovýchovná jednota Sigma Moravské železárny Olomouc)
 1979 – TJ Sigma ZTS Olomouc (Tělovýchovná jednota Sigma ZTS Olomouc)
 1990 – SK Sigma MŽ Olomouc (Sportovní klub Sigma Moravské železárny Olomouc, a.s.)
 1996 – SK Sigma Olomouc (Sportovní klub Sigma Olomouc, a.s.)

Players

Current squad

Out on loan

Notable former players

Player records in the Czech First League
.
Highlighted players are in the current squad.

Most appearances

Most goals

Most clean sheets

Managers

 Karel Brückner (1973–79)
 Milan Máčala (1980–81)
 Jaroslav Dočkal (1982–83)
 Karel Brückner (1983–87)
 Jiří Dunaj (1987–89)
 Erich Cviertna (1989–90)
 Karel Brückner (1990–93)
 Vlastimil Palička (1993–94)
 Dušan Radolský (1994–95)
 Vítězslav Kolda (1995)
 Karel Brückner (1995–97)
 Milan Bokša (1997–99)
 Leoš Kalvoda (caretaker) (1999)
 Dan Matuška (1999)
 Petr Žemlík (1999–00)
 Leoš Kalvoda (2000–01)
 Jiří Vaďura (2001–02)
 Bohumil Páník (2002)
 Jiří Kotrba (Nov 2002)
 Petr Uličný (2003 – 2006)
 Vlastimil Palička (June 2006 – Aug 2006)
 Vlastimil Petržela (Aug 2006 – June 2007)
 Martin Pulpit (2007–08)
 Jiří Fryš (2008)
 Zdeněk Psotka (July 2008 – Dec 2011)
 Petr Uličný (2011–12)
 Roman Pivarník (July 2012 – May 2013)
 Martin Kotůlek (May 2013)
 Zdeněk Psotka (2013–14)
 Ladislav Minář (2014)
 Leoš Kalvoda (2014–15)
 Václav Jílek (2015–19)
 Radoslav Látal (2019–21)
 Václav Jílek (2021–present)

History in domestic competitions

 Seasons spent at Level 1 of the football league system: 26
 Seasons spent at Level 2 of the football league system: 2

Czech Republic 

Notes

European Record

Overall record
Accurate as of 23 August 2018

Legend: GF = Goals For. GA = Goals Against. GD = Goal Difference.

Honours
Czech Cup
Winners: 2011–12
Runners-up: 2010–11
Czech Supercup
Winners: 2012
2. Liga
Winners: 2014–15, 2016–17

Club records

Czech First League records
Best position: 2nd (1995–96)
Worst position: 15th (2013–14, 2015–16)
Biggest home win: Olomouc 6–0 Teplice (2014–15) 
Biggest away win: Liberec 0–4 Olomouc (2009–10), Plzeň 0–4 Olomouc (2011–12), Mladá Boleslav 0–4 Olomouc (2018–19), Dukla Prague 0–4 Olomouc (2018–19)
Biggest home defeat: Olomouc 1–5 Slavia Prague (2000–01), Olomouc 0–4 Mladá Boleslav (2018–19)
Biggest away defeat: Sparta Prague 6–0 Olomouc (1999–2000)

References

External links

 
SK Sigma Olomouc on Soccerway
Club profile on official Czech First League website

 
Football clubs in the Czech Republic
Association football clubs established in 1919
Czechoslovak First League clubs
Czech First League clubs